The Russian Geographical Society, or RGO, is a learned society based in Saint Petersburg, Russia. It promotes geography, exploration and nature protection with research programs in fields including oceanography, ethnography, ecology and statistics.

History

Imperial Geographical Society

The society was founded in Saint Petersburg, Russia on 6 (18) August 1845. Prior to the Russian Revolution of 1917, it was known as the Imperial Russian Geographical Society.

The order to establish the society came directly from Emperor Nicholas I. The motive for the establishment was to encourage geographical research on domestic topics, which has later been described as a Russian nationalist political goal.

The filial societies were established at the Caucasus (1850), Irkutsk (1851), Vilnius (1867), Orenburg (1868), Kiev (1873), Omsk (1877), and other cities.

The Society organized and funded the expeditions of Richard Maack, Pyotr Kropotkin, Semyonov-Tyan-Shansky, Nikolai Przhevalsky, Nikolai Miklukho-Maklai, Pyotr Kozlov, Vladimir Obruchev, and Lev Berg. It helped set up the first polar stations in Russia and was one of the first to publish detailed studies of the Russian folklore and Ukrainian fairs.

The Society pioneered the systematic exploration of the Northern Urals in 1847-50, of the farthest reaches of the Amur River in 1854-63, of the vast areas of Kashgaria, Dzungaria, and Mongolia from the 1870s onward.

By 1917 the RGO was composed of eleven subdivisions and 1,000 members.

Members and presidents
The founding members of the Imperial Russian Geographical Society included:

Friedrich (Fyodor) von Berg
Karl Ernst von Baer
Ferdinand von Wrangel

Vladimir Dal
Gregor von Helmersen

Adam Johann (Ivan) von Krusenstern

Fyodor Litke
Mikhail Muravyov-Vilensky
Vladimir Odoyevsky
Vasily Alekseevich Perovsky
Pyotr Ivanovich Ricord 

Friedrich Georg Wilhelm (Vasily) von Struve

The Society's official presidents were Grand Duke Konstantin Nikolayevich of Russia in 1845-92 and Grand Duke Nicholas Mikhailovich of Russia in 1892-1917, but actually it was run by the Vice-Presidents: Fyodor Litke (1845–50, 1855–57), Count Mikhail Muravyov (1850–57), Pyotr Semyonov-Tyan-Shansky (1873–1914), and Yuly Shokalsky (1914–31).

Constantine Medal
The Constantine Medal was a gold medal worth 200 silver roubles and was the highest award of the Imperial Russian Geographical Society. It was established and named after the Society’s first chairman, Great Duke Constantine and was awarded from 1849 to 1929 to explorers who had made a significant geographical discovery or to authors of outstanding publications in geography, ethnography or Russian statistics. From 1924 to 1929 the Medal was referred to as “The highest award of the Russian Geographical Society”.

Recipients of the medal included:
1849  Ernst Reinhold von Hofmann, for his excellent work during the first expedition of the Russian Geographical Society to the Northern Urals (first award)
1858  Ivan Aksakov, for his research into trade fairs in Ukraine
1859  Ludwig Schwarz
1863  Vladimir Dahl, for the Explanatory Dictionary of the Russian Language
1864  Ivashintsov Nikolay Alekseevich, for his long-term efforts to research the Caspian Sea
1874  Nikolay Przhevalsky, for his pre-eminent scientific research, geographical discoveries and travels to Mongolia and the Tangut land
1878  Adolf Erik Nordensheld, for his voyage and research in the Arctic Ocean along the northern coast of Western and Eastern Siberia
1880  Ivan Mushketov, geologist and engineer, explorer of Central Asia
1898  Dr Gustav Radde
1900  Vladimir Obruchev, for his publications on Asian geology
1902  Pyotr Kozlov, for the 1899-1901 expedition to Tibet
1905  Alexander Kolchak, for participation in Baron E. Toll’s expedition, and for the journey to Bennett Island in particular
1905  Friedrich Schmidt
1907  Grigory Grum-Grshimailo, for all his works in Asian geography and for his Description of a Journey in Western China. Volume III
1907  Fridtjof Nansen, for his remarkable feats, which constitute a whole era in the Arctic Ocean exploration
1914  Boris Vilkitsky, for hydrographic expeditions in the Arctic Sea.

All-Union Geographical Society

The Society changed its name to the State Geographical Society in 1926 and to the Geographical Society of the USSR in 1938. After Shokalsky its presidents were geneticist Nikolai Vavilov (1931–40), zoologist Lev Berg (1940–1950), parasitologist Evgeny Pavlovsky (1952–64), glaciologist Stanislav Kalesnik (1964–77), polar explorer Aleksei Treshnikov (1977–91). The Society has convened numerous congresses and has awarded four types of medals, Big Gold Medal (tri-annual) and three, named after Litke, Semyonov, Przhevalsky (bi-annual), and also Semen Dezhnev prize (bi-annual). By 1970, it had published more than 2,000 volumes of geographical literature, including the annual Zapiski (since 1846) and Izvestiya (since 1865).

Post-Soviet era
The society reverted to its original name upon the dissolution of the Soviet Union in 1991. The main offices of the Society are in St. Petersburg.

Since 2002 the society has sponsored an annual seasonal ice base in the Arctic, Camp Barneo.

In 2009, the Minister of Defence of Russia Sergei Shoigu was elected the President of the Society. As of March 2022, he is still in office. In 2010, the Board of Trustees of the Society was established. The president of Russia Vladimir Putin was appointed chairman of the Board. Other board members included Russian oligarchs, politicians and Albert II, Prince of Monaco. The appointments of Shoigu and Putin resulted in the Society getting more subsidies from the Russian state.

The 2022 Russian invasion of Ukraine leaded to changes for the Society: the CEO of BP Bernard Looney resigned as a trustee of the Society and membership of Russia within International Geographical Union was suspended as of March 7th 2022 pending a formal decision on its membership at the next IGU General Assembly in July 2022. Nevertheless, in suspending Russia’s formal IGU membership, the IGU maintains an open door for continued engagement with colleagues in Russia..

Divisions
The Imperial Society comprised four departments:

Department of Physical Geography

Department of Mathematical Geography

Department of Ethnography
Nikolai Nadezhdin was involved in the foundation of this department, when the RGO was originally set up. During the 1850s and 1860s the  ethnographic division gathered and published material such as works of folklore and the byt or "way of life" which they regarded as reflecting the "essence" of the indigenous people of the Russian Empire.
In 1909 Dmitry Nikolayevich Anuchin, Vladimir Bogdanov and Vsevolod Miller convened the ethnographic sub-section of the Twelfth Congress of Russian Natural Scientists and Physicians held in Moscow. Here they pushed for more professionalism to distinguish ethnographers from missionaries and amateurs.

In 1917 David Zolotarev and Nikolai Mogilyansky of the RGO participated in the Commission for the Study of the Tribal Composition of the Population of the Borderlands of Russia.

Department of Statistics

Further reading 
Pyotr Semyonov-Tyan-Shansky. История полувековой деятельности Императорского Русского географического общества. Volumes 1-3. SPb, 1896.
Lev Berg. Всесоюзное Географическое общество за 100 лет. 1845-1945. Moscow-Leningrad, 1946.
Географическое общество за 125 лет. Leningrad, 1970.
Hirsch, Francine. 2005. Empire of Nations: Ethnographic Knowledge and the Making of the Soviet Union. Ithaca, NY: Cornell University Press.

See also

 List of geography awards
 List of Russian explorers

References

External links

 
The contribution of the Russian Geographical Society into the history of the ocean studies

 
Science and technology in Russia
History of geography
Geographic societies
Learned societies of Russia
Organizations based in Saint Petersburg
Organizations established in 1845
1845 establishments in the Russian Empire
Cultural heritage monuments of federal significance in Saint Petersburg